Dace Reinika (born September 23, 1958) is a Latvian politician who was a deputy of the 10th Saeima and who is the current Chair of the Council of Tērvete Municipality since 2013. She was elected as a member of the Mūsu mājas ir te ('Our Home Is Here") electoral list, but is a member of the Latvian Farmers' Union.

References

1958 births
Living people
People from Madona Municipality
Latvian Farmers' Union politicians
Deputies of the 10th Saeima
Mayors of places in Latvia
Women deputies of the Saeima
Women mayors
Latvia University of Life Sciences and Technologies alumni
21st-century Latvian women politicians